There are 88 counties in the U.S. state of Ohio. Nine of them existed at the time of the Ohio Constitutional Convention in 1802. A tenth county, Wayne, was established on August 15, 1796, and encompassed roughly the present state of Michigan. During the Convention, the county was opposed to statehood, and was not only left out of the Convention, but dissolved; the current Wayne County is in northeastern Ohio, considerably distant from the area that was the original Wayne County.

The Ohio Constitution allows counties to set up a charter government as many cities and villages do, but only Summit and Cuyahoga counties have done so, the latter having been approved by voters in November 2009. Counties do not possess home rule powers and can do only what has been expressly authorized by the Ohio General Assembly. The elected county officials in Ohio county governments include three commissioners, a sheriff (the highest law enforcement officer in the county); prosecutor (equivalent of a district attorney in other states); coroner, engineer, Recorder, auditor, treasurer, and clerk of courts.

Population figures are based on the 2021 vintage Census population estimates. The population of Ohio was 11,780,017 at that time, a decrease of 0.2% from 2020. The average population of Ohio's counties was 133,864; Franklin County was the most populous (1,321,414) and Vinton County was the least (12,696).

The Federal Information Processing Standard (FIPS) is used by the U.S. government to uniquely identify counties, and is provided for each entry. These codes link to the United States Census Bureau's "quick facts" for each county. Ohio's FIPS code of 39 is used to distinguish from counties in other states. For example, Adams County's unique nationwide identifier is 39001. However, the Bureau of Motor Vehicles and Department of Transportation instead identify counties by consecutive numbers and three-letter abbreviations, respectively. For historic preservation purposes, Ohio History Connection refers to counties by two- and three-letter abbreviations in the Ohio Archaeological Inventory and Ohio Historic Inventory, respectively.

List of counties

|}

See also
 Ohio county government
 List of Ohio townships
 Illinois County, Virginia, the county that formerly covered all of present-day Ohio

References

Further reading

 
 

Ohio, counties in
List
Counties